Live at the Village Vanguard, Vol. II is the fourth album by Japanese pianist Junko Onishi, released on February 22, 1995 in Japan. It was released on February 25, 1997 by Blue Note Records.

Track listing

Personnel
Junko Onishi - Piano
Reginald Veal - Bass
Herlin Riley - Drums

Production
Executive Producer - Hitoshi Namekata
Co-Producer - Junko Onishi
Recording and Mixing Engineer - Jim Anderson
Assistant Engineer - Brian Kingman, James Biggs, Mark Shane
Mixing Engineer - Masuzo Iida
Mastering engineer - Yoshio Okazuki
Cover Photograph - Norman Saito
Art director - Kaoru Taku
A&R - Yoshiko Tsuge

External links
Junko Onishi HP
PETER WATROUS live review from The New York Times, Nay 7, 1994

References

1995 albums
Junko Onishi albums
Albums recorded at the Village Vanguard